Tim Burke is an English visual effects supervisor. He has worked on several films and TV shows, such as Harry Potter and the Deathly Hallows – Part 2 and Doctor Who.

Early life and career 
He was born in 1965 in Newcastle-on-Tyne, Tyneside, England. Years after that he studied graphic design and did commercials, but then in 1996 started doing film effects with Ridley Scott's new company.

Recognition 
On 24 January 2012 he was nominated for an Academy Award for the film Harry Potter and the Deathly Hallows – Part 2. He had previously been on the team that won the Academy Award for Best Visual Effects for Gladiator.

References

External links

1965 births
Place of birth missing (living people)
Living people
Visual effects supervisors
Best Visual Effects Academy Award winners
Best Visual Effects BAFTA Award winners